Manda Sudharani is an Indian carnatic vocalist.

Career
Manda Sudharani is well-versed in the syntax and grammar of Carnatic classical idiom, rooted in classicism. She has performed at major carnatic events.

Rani's treatise on "Kalpita Sangeetam as the basis of Manodharma Sangeetam" resulted in the Ministry of HRD and Department of Culture, Government of India, awarding her a Junior Fellowship. She had also performed on All India Radio.

References

External links
 http://mandasudharani.blogspot.in/p/about-me.html
 Review - https://home.iitm.ac.in/arunn/2009-madras-music-season-manda-sudharani.html
 http://www.chennaidecemberseason.com/2009/12/manda-sudha-rani-exceptional-talent.html

Women Carnatic singers
Carnatic singers
Living people
Telugu people
Indian women classical singers
Singers from Andhra Pradesh
Women musicians from Andhra Pradesh
20th-century Indian women singers
20th-century Indian singers
Year of birth missing (living people)